Acanthobdellidea is an infraclass of primitive leeches; some authors place them in a separate subclass from the Hirudinea. However, the World Register of Marine Species places them within the Hirudinea, as a sister group to Euhirudinea, the true leeches. 

Species in the group include Acanthobdella peledina, described by the German zoologist Adolph Eduard Grube in 1851, and A. livanowi, described in 1966.

References

Leeches